Babe Ruth are  an English rock band from Hatfield, Hertfordshire, England. They were initially active in the 1970s and reformed in 2005.

History
A predecessor of the group, called Shacklock after guitarist Alan Shacklock, was formed in 1970.  Members included Janita Haan and Dave Hewitt, with Dave Punshon and Dick Powell later joining. The first release was their single "Wells Fargo"; their first album, First Base, went gold in Canada. In 1973, Ed Spevock replaced Powell and Chris Holmes replaced Punshon on the second album. In 1975, Steve Gurl, keyboardist from Glenn Cornick's Wild Turkey replaced Holmes for the third album. The same year, Shacklock left the band to become a record producer and Bernie Marsden (Wild Turkey) joined the team for the fourth album. After this, Haan and Hewitt left.

Though no original member remained, the group incorporated Ellie Hope and Ray Knott for the fifth album in 1976.  Shortly before Babe Ruth disbanded, they were joined by the young 17-year-old Birmingham born Simon Lambeth who made a few appearances on their last tour. Marsden moved on to join Whitesnake (after the short lived Paice Ashton Lord broke up) and Lambeth left the band.

Their 1975 single "Elusive" became a popular song on the Northern soul scene.  In the US, "Elusive" also was a hit in the discos, peaking at #12 on the National Disco Action chart.

A disco cover of Babe Ruth's "The Mexican" appeared in the late 1970s, performed by the Bombers. This version inspired an electro/freestyle cover produced by Jellybean Benitez in 1984, for which he managed to recruit Haan on vocals. The cover subsequently becoming noted for its popularity as an underground dance hit.

Between late 2005 and early 2006, Haan (now Janita Haan Morris), Hewitt, Shacklock, and Punshon reunited to record new material together in Nashville, with Spevock recording his drums in London. The album, titled Que Pasa, was completed September 2006, and after being made available in digital form via the band's official web site, was released on Revolver Records in 2009.

The band embarked on a successful reunion tour of Canada in July 2010, playing three concerts at Ottawa Bluesfest, Metropolis Montreal, and Festival International du Blues de Tremblant.

On 28 June 2014, Babe Ruth played their only show of 2014 at Milwaukee's Summerfest; over 7,000 attended.

Members
Current members
 Ed Spevock (born Edmund Anthony Spevock, 14 December 1946, London) – drums (1973–present)
 Jenny Haan (born Janita Haan, 9 May 1953, Edgware, Middlesex, now Janita Haan Morris) – lead vocals (1970–1975, 2005–present)
 Dave Hewitt (born David John Hewitt, 4 May 1950, Dewsbury, West Yorkshire) – bass, backing vocals (1970–1975, 2005–present)
 Alan Shacklock (born Alan Albert Shacklock, 20 June 1950, London) – guitars, backing vocals, organ, percussion, string arrangements (1970–1975, 2005–present)
 Dave Punshon – keyboards, piano (1971–1973, 2005–present)

Past members
 Jeff Allen (born Jeffrey Allen, 23 April 1946, Matlock, Derbyshire) – drums (1970–1971)
 Dick Powell – drums, percussion (1971–1973)
 Chris Holmes (born Christopher Noel Holmes, 12 September 1945, Cleethorpes, Lincolnshire) – keyboards (1973–1975)
 Steve Gurl – keyboards (1975–1976)
 Bernie Marsden (born Bernard John Marsden, 7 May 1951, Buckingham, Buckinghamshire) – guitars (1975–1976)
 Ellie Hope – lead vocals (1975–1976)
 Ray Knott – bass (1975–1976)
 Simon Lambeth – guitars, backing vocals (1976)

Discography

Albums
 First Base (1972), Harvest - U.S. No. 178 CAN No. 87
 Amar Caballero (1973), Harvest
 Babe Ruth (1975), Harvest (LP), (1993) One Way (CD) - U.S. No. 75; CAN No. 85
 Stealin' Home (1975) - U.S. No. 169
 Kid's Stuff (1976) - CAN No. 53
 Qué Pasa (2009)
 Qué Pasa (2021) (Renaissance Records Reissue) (Vinyl)

Singles
 "Wells Fargo" / "Theme from A Few Dollars More" (1972), Harvest
 "Ain't That Livin'" / "We Are Holding On" (1973), Harvest
 "If Heaven's on Beauty's Side" / "Doctor Love" (1974), Harvest
 "Wells Fargo" / "The Mexican" (1974) (unofficial release, released in Brazil)
 "Private Number" / "Somebody's Nobody" (1975), Harvest
 "Elusive" / "Say No More" (Spevock / Gurl) (1976), Capitol
 "The Duchess of New Orleans" / "The Jack O'Lantern" / "Turquoise" (1976), Harvest

Compilation albums
 Greatest Hits (1977)
 Grand Slam: The Best of Babe Ruth (1994)
 First Base / Amar Caballero (1998), BGO (two albums remastered with a comprehensive article about the band and photos)
 Babe Ruth / Stealin' Home (2000), BGO (two albums remastered with a comprehensive article about the band and photos)

Video
 Babe Ruth in Concert (DVD of 1975 Montreal concert)

Bootleg
 A CD of a live recording from the BBC 1975 program called The Archive Session introduced by Alan "Fluff" Freeman. Track listing:
"Intro"
"Joker"
"Black Dog"
"King Kong"
"Amar Cabellero Pt. 2"
"Isn't That So"
"Gimme Some Leg"
"Baby Pride"
"Outro"

References

 The Tapestry of Delights - The Comprehensive Guide to British Music of the Beat, R&B, Psychedelic and Progressive Eras 1963-1976, Vernon Joynson,

External links
 Babe Ruth plays in Canada 2010
 Bobby Shred's Babe Ruth tribute page
 Alex Gitlin's site
 Vic Thompson's tribute site
 Babe Ruth discography at Discogs
  imdb entry for Alan Shacklock
 Babe Ruth Facebook Page 

English hard rock musical groups
English progressive rock groups
Musical groups established in 1971
Musical groups disestablished in 1976
Musical groups reestablished in 2005
People from Hatfield, Hertfordshire
Musical groups from Hertfordshire
Harvest Records artists